El pasajero clandestino is a 1995 French-Spanish drama television film directed by Agustí Villaronga. It is adapted from the Georges Simenon novel of the same name and has a runtime of 96 minutes. It is a part of Cycle Simenon.

The film was made in the French language and dubs in Castilian Spanish and Catalan were made. The actors and actresses in the film originated from various countries.

Another film adaptation of the same book, titled The Stowaway, was released in 1958.

Plot
Several persons try to take control of the inheritance of a recently deceased English film magnate. They travel to Papeete, French Polynesia to look for the heir.

Villaronga himself said that this was a very "light" adaptation.

Cast
Simon Callow as Major Owens
Bruno Todeschini as Alfred Mougins
Mercè Pons as Lotte
Frédéric Yrondi as René Maréchal
Rosa Novell as Arlette Maréchal
Alexandre Zloto as Funke
Jesusa Andany as Ms. Justin
Enric Arredondo as Commander
Marie Atger as Mariette
Jean Marie Barsinas as Kekela
Cecilia Bellorin as Maid
Araceli Bruch as Nurse
Jordi Dauder as Sheldrake
Josep Maria Domènech as Joe Hill
François Ellis as Matala
Maito Fernández as Presenter
Josep Minguell as Bonner
Colette Pietri-Audemars as Ms. Roy
Joan Potau as Mac Lean
Alain Sens-Cazenave as Mr. Justin
Jordi Serra as Phips
Tiki Village as Pastor

Reception
Pilar Pedraza, the author of Agustí Villaronga, argued that the film was an "interesting experience" (una experiencia interesante).

References

External links

1990s drama road movies
1995 independent films
1995 films
Catalan films
Catalan-language films
Drama television films
Films about Christianity
Films about death
Films about film directors and producers
Films about infectious diseases
Films about mass media owners
Films about singers
Films based on Belgian novels
Films based on works by Georges Simenon
Films directed by Agustí Villaronga
Films set in French Polynesia
French drama road movies
French independent films
French television films
Spanish drama films
Spanish independent films
1990s Spanish-language films
Women and death
1995 drama films
Television shows based on works by Georges Simenon
1990s French films